Jäätma may refer to several places in Estonia:
Jäätma, Rakvere Parish, village in Lääne-Viru County, Estonia
Jäätma, Väike-Maarja Parish, village in Lääne-Viru County, Estonia

People
Kadri Jäätma (born 1961), Estonian ceramicist, actress and politician
Lisell Jäätma (born 1999), Estonian archer 
Robin Jäätma (born 2001), Estonian archer 

Estonian-language surnames